Utrecht University (UU; , formerly Rijksuniversiteit Utrecht) is a public research university in Utrecht, Netherlands. Established , it is one of the oldest universities in the Netherlands. In 2018, it had an enrollment of 31,801 students, and employed 7,191 faculty and staff. In 2018, 525 PhD degrees were awarded and 6,948 scientific articles were published. The 2018 budget of the university was €857 million.

Utrecht University counts a number of distinguished scholars among its alumni and faculty, including 12 Nobel Prize laureates and 13 Spinoza Prize laureates. Utrecht University has been placed consistently in the top 100 universities in the world by prominent international ranking tables. The university is ranked as the best university in the Netherlands by the Shanghai Ranking of World Universities 2022, ranked 14th in Europe and 54th in the world.

The university's motto is "Sol Iustitiae Illustra Nos", which means May the Sun of Righteousness Enlighten Us. This motto was gleaned from a literal Latin Bible translation of Malachi 4:2. Rutgers University, having historical connections with Utrecht University, uses a modified version of this motto.

Utrecht University is led by the University Board, consisting of Henk Kummeling (Rector Magnificus), Anton Pijpers (chair), Margot van der Starre (Vice Chair) and Anneloes Krul (Student Assessor).

Close ties are harboured with other institutions internationally through its membership in the Coimbra Group (CG), the League of European Research Universities (LERU), the Utrecht Network and the European University Association (EUA).

History

Utrecht University was founded on 26 March 1636. It has its roots in the Illustrious School of Utrecht, which founded two years earlier in 1634 before being elevated to the status of university in 1636. The influential professor of theology Gisbertus Voetius delivered the inaugural speech, and Bernardus Schotanus (professor of law and mathematics) became the university's first rector magnificus. Anna Maria van Schurman, who became the university's first female student, was invited to write a Latin poem for the inauguration. Initially, only a few dozen students attended classes at the university. Seven professors worked in four faculties: philosophy, which offered all students an introductory education, and three higher-level faculties (theology, medicine and law).

Utrecht University flourished in the seventeenth century, and contributed significantly to the Dutch Golden Age, despite competition with the older universities, such as Leiden (1575) and Groningen (1614). Leiden, in particular, proved a strong competitor and made further improvement necessary; a rivalry that persists to this day. A botanical garden was built on the grounds of the present Sonnenborgh Observatory, and three years later the Smeetoren added an astronomical observatory. The university attracted many students from abroad (especially from Germany, England and Scotland). They witnessed the intellectual and theological battle fought between proponents of the new philosophy (René Descartes lived for a few years in Utrecht) and proponents of the strict Reformed theologian Voetius. They also witnessed the teachings of renowned Dutch jurist, Johannes Voet, a university alumnus and professor of law, whose works remain highly authoritative in modern Roman-Dutch law.

In 1806, the French occupying authorities of the Netherlands downgraded Utrecht University to an école secondaire (high school), but after the establishment of the United Kingdom of the Netherlands in 1813 it regained its former status. Leiden, Leuven, Groningen, Utrecht and Ghent were the five universities of the new state. Two of the universities (Leuven and Ghent) became part of the new Belgian state after their respective provinces separated from the United Kingdom of the Netherlands in 1830. As a result, Utrecht University remained one of only three Dutch universities. During the French occupation, King Louis Napoleon ordered the construction of a palace in the centre of Utrecht, which eventually became the University Library City Centre.

Utrecht University played a prominent role in the golden age of Dutch science. Around 1850 the "Utrechtian School" of science formed, with Pieter Harting, Gerardus J. Mulder, Christophorus H. D. Buys Ballot and Franciscus Donders among the leading scientists. They introduced the educational laboratory (onderwijslaboratorium) as a practical learning place for their students. The National Veterinary School (Dutch:Rijks Veeartsenijschool) became Utrecht University's Faculty of Veterinary Medicine in 1918.

As the university grew, the academic buildings in the historic city centre were unable to meet the university's increasing need for space. Therefore, starting from the 1960s, a significant part of the university moved to the De Uithof campus, which occupies the easternmost part of the city and is located south of De Bilt. However, the university continued to retain its academic buildings and presence in the historic city centre.

The university is represented in the Stichting Academisch Erfgoed, a foundation with the goal of preserving the university's heritage and collections.

Organisation

The university consists of seven faculties:
Faculty of Geosciences
Department of Earth Sciences
Department of Physical Geography
Department of Sustainable Development (Copernicus Institute)
Department of Human Geography and Spatial Planning
Faculty of Humanities
Department of History and Art History
Department of Languages, Literature and Communication
Department of Media and Culture Studies
Department of Philosophy and Religious Studies
Faculty of Law, Economics and Governance
Utrecht University School of Law
Utrecht University School of Economics (USE)
Utrecht University School of Governance (USG)
Faculty of Medicine
Faculty of Science
Department of Biology
Department of Chemistry
Department of Information and Computing Sciences
Department of Mathematics
Department of Pharmaceutical Sciences
Department of Physics and Astronomy
Faculty of Social and Behavioural Sciences
Department of Education and Pedagogy
Department of Social Sciences
Department of Psychology
Faculty of Veterinary Medicine

There are three interfaculty units:
University College Utrecht
University College Roosevelt
Centre for Education and Learning (COLUU)

Campus

The two large faculties of Humanities and Law & Governance are situated in the inner city of Utrecht. The other five faculties and most of the administrative services are located in Utrecht Science Park De Uithof, a campus area on the outskirts of the city. University College Utrecht, along with the Utrecht School of Economics, are situated in the former Kromhout Kazerne, which used to be a Dutch military base. University College Roosevelt is located off-campus in the city of Middelburg in the south-west of the Netherlands.

International rankings

On the 2022 Academic Ranking of World Universities list, the University of Utrecht was ranked 54th in the world and the highest in the Netherlands. Its ranking has declined slightly since 2003, when it was ranked 40th.

In the 2022 USNWR, Utrecht University is ranked 48th (tie) best University in the world.

In the 2023 Times Higher Education World University Rankings, the university is ranked 66th.

Affiliations

Utrecht University is a member of the Coimbra Group (CG), League of European Research Universities (LERU), the Utrecht Network, the European University Association (EUA), the International Association of Universities (IAU) and the McDonnell International Scholars Academy (MISA).

Notable alumni and faculty

Utrecht University counts a number of distinguished scholars among its alumni and faculty, including 12 Nobel Prize laureates and 13 Spinoza Prize laureates.

See also
List of early modern universities in Europe
Roosevelt Academy International Honors College of Utrecht University located in Middelburg, Zeeland
University College Utrecht International Honors College of Utrecht University located in Utrecht
Utrecht Network
Utrecht School of the Arts
Utrecht Summer School
Utrecht University of Applied Sciences (HU – Hogeschool Utrecht)
Codex Boreelianus
Open Access Scholarly Publishers Association, of which Utrecht University Library is a founding member
Bijvoet Centre for Biomolecular Research, a research institute of Utrecht University in the field of molecular Life Sciences

References

External links

Utrecht University homepage
Catalogus Professorum Academiae Rheno-Traiectinae – Catalogue listing all professors who have held chairs at Utrecht University
Utrecht University datasets

 
Universities in the Netherlands
Educational institutions established in the 1630s
1636 establishments in the Dutch Republic
Buildings and structures in Utrecht (city)
Education in Utrecht (city)
Education in the Dutch Republic